Carlos A. Rivera (born July 3, 1987) is an Argentine art dealer based in Los Angeles, California. He is a graduate of the University of Southern California's School of Cinematic Arts and the Marshall School of Business. He founded RIVERA & RIVERA, a contemporary art gallery headquartered in West Hollywood, California, at the age of 22. He closed the gallery in December 2012 to head an emerging art fund. Inspired by algorithmic trading, Rivera brought on a financial engineer and data scientist to model the trajectory of emerging artists. After the fund's horizon, Rivera began publicly publishing the results of the emerging art algorithm on a website first branded as SellYouLater and shortly thereafter relaunched as ArtRank.

Career

In the years 2009, 2010 and 2011, Rivera, his gallery, and its represented artists were featured in the Los Angeles Times, New York Magazine, USA Today, Associated Press, Juxtapoz, Esquire Magazine, Complex Magazine, The Economist, Variety, Financial Times, Bloomberg, NPR, The Huffington Post, and Wired Magazine.

In the years 2014 and 2015, Rivera and ArtRank have been featured in The New York Times, The Financial Times, The Guardian, Artforum, ARTnews, ArtReview, and named to the Art+Auction Power 100.

References

External links
RIVERA & RIVERA
ArtRank

Living people
1987 births
Marshall School of Business alumni
Argentine emigrants to the United States
USC School of Cinematic Arts alumni